The Treaty of Constantinople, also known as the Peace of Istanbul or the Treaty of Ferhad Pasha, was a treaty between the Ottoman Empire and the Safavid Empire ending the Ottoman–Safavid War of 1578–1590. It was signed on 21 March 1590 in Constantinople (present-day Istanbul). The war started when the Ottomans, then ruled by Murad III, invaded the Safavid possessions in Georgia, during a period of Safavid weakness. With the empire beleaguered on numerous fronts and its domestic control plagued by civil wars and court intrigues, the new Safavid king Abbas I, who had been placed on the throne in 1588, opted for unconditional peace, which led to the treaty. The treaty put an end to 12 years of hostilities between the two arch rivals. While both the war and the treaty were a success for the Ottomans, and severely disadvantageous for the Safavids, the new status quo proved to be short lived, as in the next bout of hostilities, several years later, all Safavid losses were recovered.

War 
At the time the war commenced, the Safavid Empire was in a chaotic state under its weak ruler, Mohammad Khodabanda. In the resulting fighting, the Ottomans had managed to take most of the Safavid provinces of Azerbaijan (including the former capital Tabriz), Georgia (Kartli, Kakheti, eastern Samtskhe-Meskheti), Karabagh, Erivan, Shirvan and Khuzestan, despite Mohammad Khodabanda's initially successful counterattack. When Abbas I succeeded to the throne in 1588, the Safavid realm was still plagued by domestic issues, and thus the Ottomans managed to push further, taking Baghdad during that year and Ganja shortly after. Confronted by even more problems (i.e. civil wars, uprisings, and the war against the Uzbeks in the northeastern part of the realm), Abbas I agreed to sign a humiliating treaty with disadvantageous terms.

Treaty 
According to the treaty, the Ottoman Empire kept most of its gains in the war. These included most of the southern Caucasus (which included the Safavid domains in Georgia, composed of the Kingdoms of Kartli and Kakheti and the eastern part of the Samtskhe-Meskheti principality, as well as the Erivan Province, Karabakh, and Shirvan), the Azerbaijan Province (including Tabriz, but not Ardabil, which remained in Safavid hands), Luristan, Dagestan, most of the remaining parts of Kurdistan, Shahrizor, Khuzestan, Baghdad and Mesopotamia. A clause was included in the treaty that stipulated that the Safavids would have to stop cursing the first three caliphs, as was common ever since the first major Ottoman-Safavid treaty, namely the Peace of Amasya (1555). The Persians also agreed to pay obeisance to religious leaders of the Sunni faith.

Aftermath 
This treaty was a success for the Ottoman Empire, as vast areas had been annexed. However, the new status quo did not last for long. Abbas I would use the time and resources which resulted from the peace on the main front with the Ottomans, to successfully deal with the other issues (including the Uzbeks and other revolts), while waiting for a suitable moment to regain his possessions. When the Ottoman Empire during the reign of young sultan Ahmet I was engaged with the Celali revolts, he was able to regain most of his losses, which the Ottoman Empire had to accept in the Treaty of Nasuh Pasha, 22 years after this treaty.

See also 
 Ottoman–Safavid War (1603–1618)
 List of treaties

References

Sources
 
 Iorga, Nicolae: Geschichte des Osmanischen Reichs Vol. III, (trans: Nilüfer Epçeli) Yeditepe Yayınları, 2009,  
 
 
 
 
 
 
 
 

1590 in Asia
1590 in Europe
1590 in law
Constantinople
Constantinople 1590
Constantinople 1590
16th century in Istanbul
1590 in the Ottoman Empire
16th century in Iran
Ottoman–Persian Wars
Military history of Georgia (country)
16th century in Georgia (country)
History of the Caucasus